The domed Rodrigues giant tortoise (Cylindraspis peltastes) is an extinct species of giant tortoise in the family Testudinidae. It was endemic to Rodrigues.  It appears to have become extinct around 1800, as a result of human exploitation.

Description

The domed Rodrigues giant tortoise was one of the smallest of the giant tortoises of the Indian Ocean, reaching a length of just over 40 cm and an estimated weight of around 12 kg.

A low grazer of grasses, it shared Rodrigues Island with its much larger relative, the saddle-backed Rodrigues giant tortoise, which browsed the taller vegetation. Both species were descended from an ancestral species on Mauritius (an ancestor of Cylindraspis inepta), which colonised Rodrigues by sea many millions of years ago, and then differentiated into the two Rodrigues species.

Ecology and extinction
At the time of the arrival of human settlers, dense giant tortoise herds of many thousands were reported on Rodrigues. Like many island species, they were reported to have been friendly, curious, and unafraid of humans. However, in the ensuing years, massive harvesting and exporting for food, as well as the introduction of invasive species, rapidly exterminated the giant tortoises. Hundreds of thousands were loaded into ships' holds for food, or to be transported to Mauritius, where they were burnt for fat and oil.

A surviving giant tortoise was reported on Rodrigues in 1795, at the bottom of a ravine. As late as 1802, there is mention of survivors reportedly being killed in the large fires used to clear the island's vegetation for agriculture.

It has subsequently been discovered that the browsing herds of giant tortoises filled an essential role in the island's ecosystem and the regeneration of its forests. In recognition of this fact, measures have been undertaken to introduce replacements, in the form of similar species of tortoises from other parts of the world, to assist in the rebuilding of Rodrigues' devastated environment. The replacement species for the domed Rodrigues tortoise was chosen to be the radiated tortoise (Astrochelys radiata) of Madagascar, which is similar in size and habits.

References

Cylindraspis
Reptile extinctions since 1500
Fauna of Rodrigues
Extinct turtles
Reptiles described in 1835
Species endangered by invasive species
Species made extinct by human activities
Taxonomy articles created by Polbot